Paralithosia shaowuica is a moth of the family Erebidae. It was described by Franz Daniel in 1954. It is found in Fujian, China.

References

Lithosiini
Moths described in 1954